Mount Julian is a rural locality in the Whitsunday Region, Queensland, Australia.

Road infrastructure
The Proserpine–Shute Harbour Road (State Route 59) runs across the locality from west to east and then turns north along the eastern boundary.

References 

Whitsunday Region
Localities in Queensland